The Andrews Rocks are a small group of rocks  east of Cape Paryadin, South Georgia. The rocks are bare of vegetation and awash in heavy seas. The name "Andrews Islands" was probably given by Lieutenant Commander J.M. Chaplin, Royal Navy, of the RRS Discovery during his survey of the area in 1926. The South Georgia Survey, 1955–56, reported that "rocks" is a more suitable descriptive term for this group.

References 

Rock formations of South Georgia